KSFT-FM (107.1 MHz) - branded as "107.1 KISS FM" - is a radio station broadcasting a Top 40 (CHR) format. Licensed to the suburb of South Sioux City, Nebraska, the station serves Sioux City, Iowa. The station is currently owned by iHeartMedia, Inc.

History
KSFT-FM signed on with an adult contemporary (AC) format as "Soft 107" in 1996. The station remained an AC station until switching to Top 40 on March 13, 2006 when co-owned Top 40 KGLI "KG95" tweaked to hot adult contemporary.

External links
107.1 KISS FM

Contemporary hit radio stations in the United States
SFT-FM
Radio stations established in 1996
IHeartMedia radio stations